God Bless America is a 2011 American action black comedy film written and directed by Bobcat Goldthwait. Combining elements of political satire with dark humor, the film stars Joel Murray and Tara Lynne Barr as a middle-aged man and a teenage girl who go on a killing spree after bonding over their disgust of what U.S. culture has become in a post-9/11 world.

Plot
Frank Murdoch is a middle-aged insurance salesman who is sick of how the U.S. has fallen into a state of depravity based on pop culture, TV, the Internet, and talk radio. He fantasizes about killing his neighbors, whose screaming baby worsens his migraines and keeps him awake. The next morning, the neighbor blocks in his car with theirs, and he is frustrated when they act like he is imposing by asking them to move it. Meanwhile, Frank's ex-wife Alison has custody of their daughter Ava, who has become a spoiled brat. When Frank obtains a co-worker's address without permission to send her roses after she tells him she is feeling down, he is fired. He is later told by his uninterested doctor that he has a terminal brain tumor.

That evening, Frank's attention is caught by American Superstarz, which features an intellectually disabled man named Steven Clark who is mocked by the judges. Frank prepares to shoot himself but stops when he sees a reality show about Chloe, an extremely spoiled teenager, which gives him an epiphany. He steals his neighbor's car and drives to Chloe's school, and after unsuccessfully attempting to blow her up in her car, he shoots her through the window. Fellow student Roxanne "Roxy" Harmon witnesses this and applauds Frank, despite initially chastising him because she thought he was a pervert spying on Chloe. Roxy follows Frank back to his motel, where he is once again preparing to shoot himself, and he agrees to let her watch him do so; instead, she decides to talk him out of it. Frank explains that he only wants bad people to die, and Roxy suggests they kill Chloe's parents, who only mourn the financial loss their daughter's death has brought them.

The two travel to Chloe's home, where Frank shoots Chloe's father and Roxy stabs Chloe's mother. Roxy convinces Frank to let her join his killing spree by revealing that she is trailer trash who is at the mercy of a drug-addicted mother and rapist step-father. They visit a cinema to watch a documentary about the Mỹ Lai Massacre, and several teenagers begin acting obnoxiously. Frank and Roxy shoot all of them except for the one who did not do anything disruptive, and Frank thanks her for it after killing a man who is recording him on a smartphone. The spree continues with several other people killed, including a rude man who double-parks his car, a group of far-right religious protesters, and a popular right-wing political commentator. Frank however, does spare the fiancé of his ex-wife telling Roxy he wants him to suffer with Alison and his entitled, selfish daughter. Roxy suggests to Frank that they move to France and "go legit", with a plan to raise goats and make cheese while avoiding prosecution for the murders they have committed as France would not extradite them.

Frank's doctor calls him and reveals that he has no tumor, as his MRI results were mixed up with that of a similarly named patient who does. While eating breakfast at a motel with Roxy, Frank's new lease on life is ruined when a man at the next table assumes that Roxy is a prostitute and Frank is her pimp. Later, Frank sees a TV news missing person report in which Roxy's parents are revealed to be wholesome, middle-class, and concerned about her safety. Incensed at being lied to by Roxy, Frank takes out his anger on the man from before by strangling him to death. Frank tells Roxy that he knows the truth, and she confesses but explains that she wanted to get away from a life of bland conformity. Frank gives her the keys to his neighbor's car and leaves in the pedophile's pickup truck.

Frank buys an assault rifle from an arms dealer and sees another TV news report, revealing that Roxy is back home with her parents and that police are searching for her apparent abductor. He gains access to the American Superstarz studio, kills several audience members and a judge, and holds everybody else in the studio hostage. As the police arrive, Roxy joins Frank onstage and apologizes for lying to him. Frank gives a speech in front of the TV camera about the negative behavior promoted in today's American society and mentions that he heard about the suicide attempt by Steven, the disabled man who is now in the studio as a special guest performer; Steven points out that he attempted suicide not because they mocked him, but because they had no plans to put him back on TV. Disappointed, Frank turns to Roxy and tells her she is a pretty girla question he had refused to answer earlier in the film due to her young ageand they proceed to shoot Steven, the judges, and audience members before being gunned down by the police.

Cast

Festivals

God Bless America was selected to screen at the Toronto International Film Festival, South By Southwest Film Festival, as well as the Maryland Film Festival and the Brisbane International Film Festival.

Release
God Bless America premiered on September 9, 2011, at the 2011 Toronto International Film Festival, and was released video on demand on April 6, 2012, and in theatres on May 11, 2012. The DVD and Blu-ray for the film were released on July 3, 2012.

Critical response
God Bless America received generally mixed reviews.  the film holds a 65% approval rating on the review aggregator website Rotten Tomatoes, based on 114 reviews with an average rating of 6.17/10; its consensus read: "A darkly comic polemic on modern culture, God Bless America is uneven and somewhat thin, but the ideas behind this revenge fulfillment journey have primal appeal." Metacritic, which assigns a rating out of 100 to reviews from mainstream critics, gave a weighted average score of 56 out of 100 based on 24 reviews, indicating "mixed or average reviews".

Chicago Sun-Times critic Roger Ebert gave the film 2 stars out 4, and wrote: "this is a film that begins with merciless comic savagery and descends into merely merciless savagery. But wow, what an opening." James Berardinelli of Reelviews praised the film by giving 3 stars out of 4, calling it "funny but it is also at times uncomfortable". Owen Gleiberman of Entertainment Weekly gave a C, and described the film as "a burlesque that turns into a harangue that turns into a rampage." Ella Taylor of NPR gave a positive review, and wrote: "God Bless America ends with a couple of tale-twisting bullet orgies designed to take your preconceptions, as well as your nerve-endings, by surprise."

Accolades

Notes

References

External links
 
 
 
 
 

2011 films
2011 black comedy films
2010s crime comedy films
2011 independent films
2010s road movies
Films about cancer
American black comedy films
American crime comedy films
American independent films
American political satire films
American road movies
Films directed by Bobcat Goldthwait
Films with screenplays by Bobcat Goldthwait
Films set in a movie theatre
American action comedy films
2010s English-language films
2010s American films